Theresa Hak Kyung Cha  (March 4, 1951 – November 5, 1982) was an American novelist, producer, director, and artist of South Korean origin, best known for her 1982 novel, Dictee.  Considered an avant-garde artist, Cha was fluent in Korean, English, and French.  In her works, Cha took language apart and experimented with it. Cha's interdisciplinary background was clearly evident in Dictee, which experiments with juxtaposition and hypertext of both print and visual media. Cha's Dictee is taught in contemporary literature classes including women's literature.

A week after her novel Dictee was published, Cha was raped and murdered by a security guard at the Puck Building in New York City, on November 5, 1982.

Early life 
Cha was born in Busan, South Korea during the Korean War. She was the middle child of five to Hyung Sang Cha (father) and Hyung Soon Cha (mother), who were both raised in Manchuria during Japan’s occupation of Korea and China, and forced to learn and work in Japanese.

Cha and her family emigrated to the United States in 1962, first settling in Hawaii and then relocating in 1964 to the San Francisco Bay Area, where she attended Convent of the Sacred Heart High School.  During her time there, Cha studied French. She was fluent in French, English and Korean.

Education
At Sacred Heart, Cha studied Western classics and language. She also studied French, Greek, and Roman classics. During her time at Sacred Heart, she sang in the choir. By the time she graduated Cha had earned many scholastic awards, including a poetry contest prize at the age of fourteen, two years after she started learning English.

Before committing to Berkeley, Cha attended the University of San Francisco for a semester. She transferred to UC-Berkeley the following year, where she completed her studies in art and writing. One of her classmates at Berkeley was artist Yong Soon Min. 

As a student, she became close friends with Dennis Love, another student, and Bertrand Augst, a professor of French and comparative literature. Her classes with Augst inspired Cha to study comparative literature, in which she later earned degrees. Teachers and friends have stated that Cha enjoyed reading broadly, anything from Korean poetry to European modernist and postmodern literature. She received her B.A. in comparative literature in 1973 and a B.A. in art in 1975, both from Berkeley. She worked as a student employee of the Pacific Film Archive for three years between 1974 and 1977 while earning two graduate degrees in art (M.A., 1977; M.F.A., 1978).
 
As a graduate student, she became close friends with Mechert and even became his teaching assistant in 1976. As Cha's interest in film grew, she studied at Berkeley under Bertrand Augst, who recalls her interest in poetry written by Stéphane Mallarmé and plays by Samuel Beckett. According to Augst, Cha felt an affinity with Mallarmé's associative and restrained use of language. Beckett's highly reductive style of theater found echoes in the spare setting of Cha's performances. More than the stylistic influence of Beckett or Mallarmé, Cha's studies of film theory with Augst had perhaps the greatest effect on her development. Augst taught his students structural and semiological film analysis, frequently using an Athena projector, which can slow a film to a single frame. This frame-by-frame study greatly inspired Cha's own films and use of video stills. 

In 1976, she decided to pursue a degree in film theory at the UC Education Abroad Program, Centre d'Etudes Americain du Cinema, in Paris. During her stay she studied under Jean-Louis Baudry, Raymond Bellour, Monique Wittig, and Christian Metz.

Career and personal life

Cha began her career as a performance artist, producer, director, and writer in 1974. She also worked as an usher and cashier from 1974 to 1977 at the Pacific Film Archive, with friends.

In 1979 Cha traveled back to South Korea for the first time in seventeen years. She had long expressed great anticipation to return in her book Exilée, where she describes the flight in terms of the sixteen time zones that separate San Francisco from Seoul. It was a sorrowful but memorable trip. The excitement of finally returning to her homeland was diminished by the cool reception she received from her own people, to whom she was just another foreigner.  "...she visited South Korea with her brother in the midst of massive student demonstrations, only to learn that she was a stranger at home." 

Cha performed "Other Things Seen, Other Things Heard" at the San Francisco Museum of Modern Art in 1979, attracting the attention of Robert Atkins, art critic for the San Francisco Bay Guardian.

In August 1980, Cha moved to New York City, working as an editor and writer for Tanam Press. Earlier that year, she also traveled to Japan and then back to South Korea, this time working on the film White Dust From Mongolia from May to July 1980 with her brother. They were never able to finish the film due to the dangerous political situation in South Korea at the time. South Korea's President Park Chung Hee had just been assassinated that previous May and restrictive new laws had been declared. The Chas were harassed by South Korean officials who thought they might be North Korean spies. 

In 1981, Cha began teaching video art at Elizabeth Seton College while working in the design department of the Metropolitan Museum of Art. She was awarded an artist's residence at the Nova Scotia College of Art and Design in 1982.

While some authors have described Cha's character as ambitious and disciplined, others have described her as undisciplined, tragic, pure, and intelligent. She married photographer Richard Barnes in May 1982; the two had met in a drawing class in 1975, during her time at UC Berkeley.

Style

Themes
From 1910 to 1945, the Korean language was forbidden to be communicated in Korea under Japanese rule.  Cha linked her own process of learning language – whether that be in her Korean first language, English, French or Latin – to the extraordinary cultural oppression experienced in Korea during this nearly 40-year period. 

In the body of Cha's art, language functions as fluid binary systems of contemporaneous displacement and reunification, repression and freedom, detachment and engagement, and the ineffable and communication. The main body of Cha's work is "looking for the roots of language before it is born on the tip of the tongue". Much of Cha's work demonstrates an interaction and interplay between languages with her primary focus on "grammatical structures of a language, syntax, how words and meaning are constructed in the language system itself, by function or usage, and how transformation is brought about through manipulation, processes as changing the syntax, isolation, removing from context, repetition, and reduction to minimal units".

Since language unified Cha's aesthetic approach, establishing an intimate dialogue with the audience was a deliberate consideration in her art. The audience held a "privileged place in that She/He is the receptor and or activator central to an exchange or dialogue".  

For Cha, the audience is the "Other" whose presence establishes, or completes, any form of communication. As she writes in "audience distant relative":

There was no firm delineation between Cha's visual and linguistic approaches to literature and art. Her visual and performance work often involved words and letters manipulated such as changing the sizes and placement of letters. These words are often imposed on or near images as a form of communication, another theme in Cha's work.

Dictee heavily features French and English, along with others, often together on the same page. Commonly, the languages are used in repetitive, "broken" phrases and frequent code-switching, similar to the communication of an individual learning the languages. According to Hyun Yi Kang, this style causes readers to "[reconsider] the arbitrary and ideologically colored prescriptions on language and writing, challenging the requirements of good speech and correct grammar."

Other common themes in Cha's work include diaspora, the mother tongue, and the narrative device of stream of consciousness.

In the visual arts, Cha’s work echoes both the conceptual art movement on the West Coast and the Fluxus movement. In the same way that her writing defies generic fixation and speaks in illuminating ways about identity and subjectivity, her artworks represent an eclectic combination of international artistic developments and localized experiences of identity. One of the early contemporary artists of the Korean diaspora in the United States, Cha’s work has already begun to think about how the mainstream avant-garde tradition is reinvented by artists and its periphery. 

Like Fox and Conceptual artists around her time, she was interested in the use of body and language in art. Her video art, Mouth to Mouth (1975), depicting the artist’s mouth silently voicing the eight vowels in the Korean language, is structurally similar to Fox’s Tonguings (1970) and Bruce Nauman’s Lip Sync (1967). However, with the addition of Cha’s distinct approach to language and semiotics, Mouth to Mouth uses the techniques of body-based video art to convey her own foreign and diasporic identity, illuminating the uneven functioning of language throughout colonial history.

Throughout her video art, she was interested in the material experience of language in terms of its textual, aural, and audial quality instead of just the epistemology of language explored by East Coast Conceptual artists like Joseph Kosuth. In her video art Vidéoème (1976), she uses word plays to invoke the multifaceted perception of language across the senses, but this experience of language is also centered around a loss and invisibility evident in the title’s wordplay: "vidé" means emptied in French, while "video" is both the genre of the work and the word for “to see” in Latin.

She was also interested in consciously manipulating videotapes to convey nuanced meanings. For example, in Mouth to Mouth, the pixelation of the image and the dubbing of the sound of the original videotape accentuate a sense of inscrutability rather than visibility achieved through video technology.

Influences 
Cha was influenced by a variety of sources.  Her friends say that she was inspired by the art activity around her, but there has been little analysis of this aspect of her development as an artist. Cha was inspired by artist Terry Fox, a fellow artist and performer. She met him in 1973, during one of his solo exhibitions at the UAM, now Art, Design & Architecture Museum at UCSB. Cha came to his performances and watched Fox and his brother Larry interact with various materials and objects, such as metal and a mirror. 

Fox's exhibit involved a variety of media and formats, including performance, sculpture, and drawing. Cha drew her inspiration from Fox's slow, ritualistic performances. The translucent veil employed by Fox to demarcate and isolate his performance space was a device Cha used in her performances ″A Ble Wail″ (1975) and Pause Still (1979; performed with her sister Bernadette). Cha also used props—candles, bamboo sticks, flour—in some of her performance, which Fox had previously used in his own. Cha and Fox have been compared in similar slow, deliberate, almost trance-like paces they employed in their performance work. Fox had witnessed a few of Cha's performances and commented on the way she moved in the space, barefoot, not making a sound. 

During her time as an usher Cha became interested in the work of Marguerite Duras, Jean-Luc Godard, Alain Resnais, Yasujirō Ozu, and many other film theorists and artists. Carl Dreyer was a particularly recurrent influence, particularly his film The Passion of Joan of Arc (1928), which was quoted in Cha's super-8 and video installation Exilée (1980) among other instances in her work.

In the visual arts, her work has been included in the expanded account of conceptual art initiated by the exhibition Global Conceptualism: Points of Origin, 1950s–1980s, in addition her work usually features in the San Francisco Bay-area accounts of conceptual art, the dates of which are later than the  East Coast accounts. Lawrence Rinder notes that San Francisco Bay-area conceptualism of the 1970s also "tended to invest conceptual forms with personal and physical qualities."

Death 
On November 5, 1982, Cha was raped and murdered by Joey Sanza, a security guard at the Puck Building on Lafayette Street in lower Manhattan. She had gone there to meet her husband Richard Barnes, who was documenting the renovation of the building and had an office there. Sanza raped, strangled, and then bludgeoned her to death, removing a ring from her finger. Her death occurred just one week after the publication of Dictee. 

Sanza, who had already been imprisoned in Florida for 12 counts of sexual battery committed between January and June of 1982, was indicted for the rape and murder of Cha in 1983, and, after three separate trials, eventually convicted on those charges in 1987.

Shortly before her death, Cha had been working on an artistic piece for a group show at Artists Space in SoHo. The Artists Space exhibit ultimately became a memorial for her, showcasing images and text from Dictee. Additional work left incomplete at the time of her death included another film, a book, a critique of advertising, and a piece on the representation of hands in Western painting.

Legacy
In 1991, nine years following Cha's murder, her brother and director of the Theresa Hak Kyung Cha Memorial Foundation, John Cha, asked if the University of California Berkeley Art Museum would be able to set up safe-keeping of Cha's videos, artwork, and archives. The gift was accepted by the Berkeley Art Museum and Pacific Film Archive (BAMPFA) in 1992. Some of Cha's work is available through the Electronic Arts Intermix (EAI).

In 1994, a collection of critical essays on Dictee edited by Elaine Kim and Norma Alarcón, Writing Self, Writing Nation, was released by Third Woman Press. Today Dictee is widely studied in contemporary literature classes, including classes on avant-garde writing, feminist and Asian American literature.

Elvan Zabunyan wrote the first monograph of Cha's work and published it in 2013.

Exhibitions
Cha's first professional exhibition was part of a group show in 1980 at the San Francisco Art Institute Annual. A posthumous showing of Cha's work was organized by her friend Judith Barry and exhibited at Artists Space a month after her death. Her first solo exhibition was held at the Whitney Museum in 1993 with little publicity.

Catalogued in the book of the same name, an exhibition of Cha's work entitled The Dream of the Audience: Theresa Hak Kyung Cha (1951-1982) was organized and shown in 2001 at the University of California Berkeley Art Museum by senior curator Constance Lewallen. This exhibition, building off the work of two previously organized by former curator Lawrence Rinder, aimed to display lesser known work by Cha including other published works, videos, performances, works on paper, and mail art. The exhibit later went on tour, including stops in Irvine (Beall Center for Art and Technology), New York City (Bronx Museum of the Arts), Illinois (Krannert Art Museum), and Seattle (Henry Art Gallery), with a final stop in Seoul. The exhibition continued to Vienna (Generali Foundation) and Barcelona (Fundació Antoni Tàpies).

Cha's work was exhibited again in Paris (group exhibition Fais un effort pour te souvenir. Ou, à défaut, invente., at the ) and London (A Portrait in Fragments, sponsored and hosted by The Korean Cultural Centre UK; and with a showing of her films at the Institute of Contemporary Arts) in 2013.

In 2018, BAMPFA staged an exhibition based on Cha's book Dictee entitled Theresa Hak Kyung Cha: Avant Dictee, organized by assistant curator Stephanie Cannizzo. The Cleveland Museum of Art also staged Cha's video work in a show entitled Theresa Hak Kyung Cha: Displacements in 2018.

An assortment of Cha's videos and works on paper were selected as a part of the 2022 Whitney Biennial exhibition.

Online public portraits
According to Cathy Park Hong in Minor Feelings: An Asian American Reckoning, many online photos under Cha's name depict the artist's younger sister, Bernadette Hak-Eun Cha:

Hong states,  When you google Cha, the first author photo that comes up is the film still of her sister Bernadette from her video PERMUTATIONS. This still of Bernadette is often confused for Cha herself...

Only one real photo of Cha circulates online. Cha has long hair and wears a black turtleneck and tight jeans. She is in profile, staring out the window of her Berkeley apartment in a studied pose. While this picture is used as her official photo, most readers imagine Bernadette when they think they're imagining Cha."

Published works

Filmography and videography
Selected works distributed by Electronic Arts Intermix, Inc., New York

 Secret Spill (1974) 27 min., b&w, sound
 Mouth to Mouth (1975) 8 min., b&w, sound
 Permutations (1976) 10 min., b&w, sound
 Vidéoème (1976) 3 min., b&w, sound
 Re Dis Appearing (1977) 3 min., b&w, sound
 White Dust From Mongolia (1980) 30 min., b&w (uncompleted)

Performances
 Barren Cave Mute (1974), at the University of California, Berkeley.
 Aveugle Voix (1975), at 63 Bluxome Street, San Francisco.
 A Ble Wail (1975), at Worth Ryder Gallery, University of California, Berkeley.
 Life Mixing (1975), at University Art Museum, Berkeley.
 From Vampyr (1976), at Centre des etudes americains du cinema, Paris, inspired by the film Vampyr
 Reveille dans la Brume (1977), at La Mamelle Arts Center and Fort Mason Arts Center, San Francisco.
 Monologue (1977), KPFA Radio Station, Berkeley.
 Other Things Seen. Other Things Heard (1978), at Western Front Gallery, Vancouver, and the San Francisco Museum of Modern Art (SFMOMA).
 Pause Still (1979), 80 Langton Street, San Francisco.
 Exliee (1980), San Francisco Art Institute, SFMOMA, The Queens Museum (1981)

References

Further reading
 Best, Susan, "The Dream of the Audience: The Moving Images of Theresa Hak Kyung Cha." Visualizing Feeling: Affect and the Feminine Avant-Garde. London: I.B. Tauris, 2011 

 
 Kwon, R.O. "Theresa Hak Kyung Cha's Radical Refusal to Explain Herself." The New Yorker, November 9, 2022.

External links
"The Dream of the Audience: Theresa Hak Kyung Cha (1951–1982)" Exhibition Review
Voices From the Gaps biography
Theresa Hak Kyung Cha: Bronx Museum of the Arts - Reviews: New York
Theresa Hak Kyung Cha at SF Cinematheque: To See, Empty
The Theresa Hak Kyung Cha Archive at the Berkeley Art Museum/Pacific Film Archive, University of California Berkeley
Guide to the Theresa Hak Kyung Cha Collection 1971-1991
The Dream of the Audience: Theresa Hak Kyung Cha documentary film project
 Art Collection Highlights - Theresa Hak Kyung Cha
 A Portrait in Fragments: Theresa Hak Kyung Cha 1951–1982 (15 Jan 2014)

Reviews
Avant Dictee
 
 
 

1951 births
1982 deaths
21st-century American novelists
American novelists of Asian descent
American performance artists
American writers of Korean descent
Postmodern writers
People from Busan
People murdered in New York City
South Korean emigrants to the United States
University of California, Berkeley alumni
20th-century American novelists
American women novelists
Schools of the Sacred Heart alumni
20th-century American women writers
Rapes in the United States
Violence against women in the United States
South Korean contemporary artists
South Korean women artists
American artists of Korean descent